Yuma William "Bill" Rowdy ( 1862March 29, 1893) was a United States Army Indian scout and a recipient of the United States military's highest decoration—the Medal of Honor—for his actions during the Cherry Creek Campaign in the Arizona Territory.

Military service
Rowdy, a Yavapai, was a Sergeant in Company A of the Indian Scouts. He was involved in an engagement in Arizona on March 7, 1890, and was awarded the Medal of Honor two months later, on May 15, 1890, for his "[b]ravery in [the] action with Apache Indians."

Rowdy was killed in a brothel in Miami, Arizona, three years after earning the medal and was buried in Santa Fe National Cemetery, Santa Fe, New Mexico, with full military honors. His grave is in section A, grave 894.

Medal of Honor citation
Rank and organization: Sergeant, Company A, Indian Scouts. Place and date: Arizona, March 7, 1890. Entered service at: ------. Birth: Arizona. Date of issue: May 15, 1890.

Citation:

Bravery in action with Apache Indians.

See also

 List of Medal of Honor recipients
 List of Medal of Honor recipients for the Indian Wars
 List of Native American Medal of Honor recipients

References

External links
 
 

1893 deaths
United States Army Indian Scouts
Native American people of the Indian Wars
United States Army Medal of Honor recipients
Native American United States military personnel
United States Army soldiers
Apache Wars
American Indian Wars recipients of the Medal of Honor
Year of birth missing
Yavapai